Yano (written: 矢野) is a Japanese surname. Notable people with the surname include:

 Akihiro Yano, Japanese baseball player
 Akiko Yano, Japanese pop and jazz musician
 Alexander B. Yano, 38th Chief of Staff of the Armed Forces of the Philippines
 Candace A. Yano, American academic
 Keiichi Yano, Japanese video game designer
 Keita Yano, Japanese professional wrestler
 Kentaro Yano (mathematician)
 Kentarō Yano, manga artist
 Kisho Yano, Japanese footballer
 Maki Yano, Japanese J-pop singer
 Rodney J. T. Yano, United States Army soldier
, Japanese model
 Sho Yano, Asian-American child prodigy
 Takashi Yano, Japanese politician
 Takeo Yano, Japanese judoka
 , Japanese science fiction translator and writer
 Tetsuro Yano, Japanese politician
 Toshi Yano, American bass guitarist
 Toshinobu Yano, Japanese photographer
 Toru Yano, Japanese professional wrestler

Japanese-language surnames